Karun (also Romanized as Kārūn) is a village in Asir Rural District, Asir District, Mohr County, Fars Province, Iran. At the 2006 census, its population was 884, in 180 families.

References 

Populated places in Mohr County